Nisiturris is a genus of sea snails, marine gastropod mollusks in the family Pyramidellidae, the pyrams and their allies.

Species
Species within the genus Nisiturris include:
 Nisiturris alma (Thiele, 1925)
 Nisiturris anfraconvex (Peñas & Rolán, 2010)
 Nisiturris angustissima (Melvill, 1904)
 Nisiturris crystallina (Dall & Bartsch, 1906)
 Nisiturris darnleyensis (Brazier, 1877)
 Nisiturris diezi (Peñas & Rolán, 1997)
 Nisiturris fernandezantoni (Peñas & Rolán, 2010)
 Nisiturris fluminensis (Pimenta & Absalão, 2004)
 Nisiturris gabrieli (Hedley, 1910)
 Nisiturris obliqua (Saurin, 1959)
 Nisiturris obliquastructionis (Peñas & Rolán, 2010)
 Nisiturris phuae (Saurin, 1959)
 Nisiturris ryalli (Peñas & Rolán, 1997)
 Nisiturris trinquieri (Saurin, 1959)
 Nisiturris tumidula (Corgan & Van Aartsen, 1998)
Species brought into synonymy
 Nisiturris melvilli (Dautzenberg, 1912): synonym of Turbonilla melvilli Dautzenberg, 1912 (alternate representation)
 Nisiturris tumida (Saurin, 1959): synonym of Nisiturris tumidula (Corgan & Van Aartsen, 1998)

References

External links
 World Register of Marine Species

Pyramidellidae